The Church of All Saints is situated in the Roudna quarter near the historic center of Pilsen. It is one of the oldest churches in the area and it was considered the main parish church of the early villages of Pilsen, Malice and Zahorsko before the construction of the St. Bartholomew cathedral was completed.

History 
The initial Romanesque church was constructed in the 13th century.

In 1310 the Henry of Bohemia granted the patronage right to the Teutonic order, which enforced this right and established the church of St. Bartholomew, which was set to become the parish church of the early Pilsen.

According to result of the new situation the Church of All Saints lost its privileged status and become a filial church. The church was reconstructed in the Gothic style at the end of the 14th century.

During the Hussite Wars, the church's nave was significantly damaged and for this reason the church was repaired during the rest of the century.

In 1743 a Baroque entrance hall was built as an annex to the initial entrance gate

There were numerous continuous repairs during the 19th century. The repairs also focused on the interior.

During a WWII bombardment a stray bomb fell down through the presbytery of the church and the altar and caused a significant damage. Part of the presbytery burned down.

After a whole century of repairs the church was opened and consecrated again by Mons. Frantisek Radkovsky in 1995.

Nowadays the church is maintained and operated by the franciscans of Pilsen.

Church exterior 
The temple is a one nave Church with a presbytery on the eastern portion, which ends at a polygonal five-sided closure. The wall and pillar lining materials are blocks of sandstone.

Entrance 
The main entrance at the southern facade serves as an access to the church.

It has two concave walls with two late-Baroque rounded windows lined with pilasters ending in a baluster entablature with a densely profiled molding.

Presbytery and the church nave 
The presbytery and the nave are supported by diagonal and setback buttresses with roof-like skews. The church's entire parameter is encircled by a window ledge.

The presbytery is surrounded by plinths culminating in a cornice of the window-sill. All four presbytery windows are Gothic with the Flamboyant, a flame-like tracery.

The other windows in the nave have a form of a pointed shape without traceries.

Church sacristy 
The northern part of the presbytery wall is nowadays connected by the portal with the sacristy, which was originally built as a separate chapel without access to the church.

The sacristy is supported by diagonal buttresses topped with roof-like skews.

It is covered with a shed roof connecting to the presbytery.

Similarly, as the nave windows, the shape of the window on the eastern side is pointed.

Church interior

Church nave and presbytery 
The nave is vaulted by a groin vault with the ribs leading to decorative cantilevers located along the interior walls.

A high choir was built on the western end of the nave in the 16th century. Similarly, the space under the high choir is vaulted by a groin vault with a spiral staircase leading to the upper level.

A linear massive pointed triumphal arch divides the nave from the presbytery.

The presbytery is vaulted by a figured rib vault, which is ending in a polygonal five-sided closing. Rectangular supports standing on a plinth surrounding the presbytery support the vault.

Church sacristy 
The Sacristy is vaulted by a jumping vault that leads to the diagonal buttress-supported console.

Photo Gallery

References

Literature 
 ROŽMBERSKÝ, Petr. Kunčin Hrádek a kostel Všech svatých v Plzni. nadace České hrady. Plzeň, 1996. Zapomenuté hrady tvrze a místa. 80-238-4707-4 
RŮŽIČKA, David. Plzeňská tajemství. Plzeň: NAVA, 2009, 116 p. .
 BĚLOHLÁVEK, Miloslav, Jaromír KOVÁŘ, Miloslav ŠVÁB and Adolf ZEMAN. Dějiny Plzně I: Od počátků do roku 1788. Plzeň: Západočeské nakladatelství v Plzni, 1965. ISBN.
 MARTINOVSKÝ, Ivan. Dějiny Plzně v datech: od prvních stop osídlení až po současnost. Vyd. 1. Praha: Lidové noviny, 2004, 787 s. .

External links

 https://www.pilsen.eu/tourist/visit/other-places-of-interest/churches/churches.aspx

Churches in Plzeň
Buildings and structures completed in the 14th century